Colnbrook Estate Halt railway station was a station on the now closed railway line between  and , on the western edge of London, England. It was opened on 1 May 1961 by British Railways to serve the Colnbrook Industrial Estate.

The station closed to passengers on 29 March 1965 following the Beeching Report and has been completely demolished although the line through its site serves an aggregate depot and a fuel depot.

References 

Disused railway stations in Berkshire
Railway stations opened by British Rail
Railway stations in Great Britain opened in 1961
Railway stations in Great Britain closed in 1965
Beeching closures in England